Celiptera Valina is a moth of the family Erebidae. It is found in North America, including Texas and Arizona.

The wingspan of Celiptera Valina is about 34 mm. In the wild Celiptera larvae feed on low growing members of the legume family (Fabaceae).

References

External links
Images
Image

Moths described in 1901
Celiptera